Emily Lewis (born 15 May 1993) is a British canoeist. She competed in the women's K-1 200 metres and the K-1 500 metres  events at the 2020 Summer Olympics.

References

External links
 

1993 births
Living people
British female canoeists
Canoeists at the 2020 Summer Olympics
Olympic canoeists of Great Britain
Canoeists at the 2015 European Games
European Games competitors for Great Britain
People from Royal Tunbridge Wells